Oraovica is a village located in the municipality of Preševo, Serbia. According to the 2002 census, the village had a population of 3774 people. Of these, 3737 (99,01 %) were ethnic Albanians, 2 (0,05 %) Muslims, 1 (0,02 %) Serb and 26 (0,68 %) others.

See also
 Battle of Oraovica

References

Populated places in Pčinja District
Albanian communities in Serbia